The Juno Award for Traditional Jazz Album of the Year was presented as recognition each year for the best traditional jazz album in Canada. It was first presented in 1994, after the Juno Awards split the former award for Best Jazz Album into separate categories for traditional and contemporary jazz, and was discontinued after 2014, when the traditional and contemporary jazz categories were replaced with new categories for Jazz Album - Solo and Jazz Album - Group.

Winners

Best Mainstream Jazz Album (1994 – 1999)

Best Traditional Jazz Album – Instrumental (2000 – 2002)

Traditional Jazz Album of the Year (2003 – 2014)

References

Traditional Album Of The Year
Jazz awards
Album awards